Daviesia mimosoides, commonly known as blunt-leaf bitter-pea, narrow-leaf bitter pea or leafy bitter-pea, is a species of flowering plant in the family Fabaceae and is endemic to eastern continental Australia. It is an open shrub with tapering, linear, elliptic or egg-shaped phyllodes, and groups of orange-yellow and dark brownish-red to maroon flowers.

Description

Taxonomy
Daviesia mimosoides was first formally described in 1811 by Robert Brown in Aiton's Hortus Kewensis. The specific epithet (mimosoides) means "Mimosa-like".

In 1991, Michael Crisp described two subspecies, and the names are accepted by the Australian Plant Census:
 Daviesia mimosoides subsp. acris Crisp has slightly glaucous leaves with a wedge-shaped base;
 Daviesia mimosoides R.Br. subsp. mimosoides has dull green leaves that are narrower than those of subspecies acris and have a tapering base.

Distribution and habitat
Subspecies acris is restricted to exposed rocky peaks from the Brindabella Range in the Australian Capital Territory, through southern New South Wales to eastern Victoria, at altitudes above .

References

mimosoides
Flora of New South Wales
Flora of the Australian Capital Territory
Flora of Victoria (Australia)
Flora of Queensland
Plants described in 1811
Taxa named by Robert Brown (botanist, born 1773)